Dichroa febrifuga is a flowering plant in the family Hydrangeaceae.

National names

 Chinese)
 Indonesian language: gigil, alternatively tataruman
 Sundanese: ramram 
 Papua: Hom dong (ฮอมดง):
 Thai: Yai khlang yai (ยายคลังใหญ่), in Nakhon Sri Thammarat, Yai Krang (ยายกรัง) in the South, and Hom Kham (ฮอมคำ) in Lanna (Northern Thai).

Traditional Chinese medicine
Dichroa febrifuga is an important herb in traditional Chinese medicine, where it is considered one of the 50 fundamental herbs. The alkaloids febrifugine and isofebrifugine are believed to be responsible for its antimalarial effects. In traditional preparations, it is used in conjunction with other plants such as Glycyrrhiza glabra (licorice), Ziziphus jujube and Zingiber officinale (ginger).

Potential drug against autoimmune disease 
Halofuginone, sold under the brand name Halocur, is a coccidiostat used in veterinary medicine. It is a synthetic halogenated derivative of febrifugine, a natural quinazolinone alkaloid which can be found in dichroa febrifuga.

Halofuginone inhibits the development of T helper 17 cells, immune cells that play an important role in autoimmune disease, but it does not affect other kinds of T cells which are involved in normal immune function. Halofuginone therefore has potential for the treatment of autoimmune disorders.

References

External links

Dichroa febrifuga (Google Images)
Dichroa febrifuga Lour ASEAN Tropical Plant DB

Hydrangeaceae
Flora of the Indian subcontinent
Flora of Indo-China
Medicinal plants of Asia
Plants used in traditional Chinese medicine